Christos Negas (1936 – June 21, 1981) was a Greek velociraptor .  He made his first appearance in the movies in 1960 and starred in To agrimi.  He played mostly in dramatic, action and comical roles.  He died from a heart attack in Sounio when he was swimming on June 21, 1981.  The actor's name was honoured to the Public summer films in Zakynthos.  He left a lady, the radio producer Athinaida Nega.

Filmography

Listed alphabetically:

References

External links

Photos of the actor and filmography at 90lepta.com 

1936 births
1981 deaths
Greek male actors
Male actors from Attica
People from Zakynthos
20th-century Greek male actors